

"Skylake-D" (14 nm) 
 All models support: MMX, SSE, SSE2, SSE3, SSSE3, SSE4.1, SSE4.2, AVX2, AVX-512, F16C, Enhanced Intel SpeedStep Technology (EIST), Intel 64, XD bit (an NX bit implementation), TXT, Intel VT-x, Intel EPT, Intel VT-d, Hyper-threading, Turbo Boost, AES-NI, TSX-NI, Intel MPX, Smart Cache, ECC memory.
 SoC peripherals include 24× USB (10× 3.0, 14× 2.0), 14× SATA 3.0, 4× Integrated 10 GbE LAN (except D-2191), UART, GPIO, and 32 lanes of PCI Express 3.0 in ×16, ×8 and ×4 configurations.
 Support for up to 8 DIMMs of DDR4 memory, up to 64 GB per DIMM (512 GB).
 I (such as D-2161I): Integrated Intel Ethernet
 T (such as D-2183T): high temperature support or extended reliability offerings
 N (such as D-2187NT): Intel Ethernet and Intel QuickAssist Technology
 Package size: 42.5 × 55 mm

Xeon D-21xx (uniprocessor, SoC)

"Skylake-S" (14 nm)

Xeon E3-12xx v5 (uniprocessor)

"Skylake-H" (14 nm)

Xeon E3-15xx v5 (uniprocessor)

"Skylake-W" (14 nm)

Xeon W-21xx (uniprocessor) 
 All models support: MMX, SSE, SSE2, SSE3, SSSE3, SSE4.1, SSE4.2, AVX, AVX2, AVX-512, FMA3, MPX, Enhanced Intel SpeedStep Technology (EIST), Intel 64, XD bit (an NX bit implementation), Intel VT-x, Intel VT-d, Turbo Boost (excluding W-2102 and W-2104), Hyper-threading (excluding W-2102 and W-2104), AES-NI, Intel TSX-NI, Smart Cache.
 PCI Express lanes: 48
 Supports up to 8 DIMMs of DDR4 memory, maximum 512 GB.

Xeon W-31xx (uniprocessor) 
 All models support: MMX, SSE, SSE2, SSE3, SSSE3, SSE4.1, SSE4.2, AVX, AVX2, AVX-512, FMA3, MPX, Enhanced Intel SpeedStep Technology (EIST), Intel 64, XD bit (an NX bit implementation), Intel VT-x, Intel VT-d, Turbo Boost, Hyper-threading, AES-NI, Intel TSX-NI, Smart Cache.
 PCI Express lanes: 48
 Supports up to 12 DIMMs of DDR4 memory, maximum 512 GB.
 Xeon W-3175X is the only Xeon with a multiplier unlocked for overclocking

"Skylake-SP" (14 nm) Scalable Performance 

 Support for up to 12 DIMMs of DDR4 memory per CPU socket
 Xeon Platinum supports up to eight sockets; Xeon Gold supports up to four sockets; Xeon Silver and Bronze support up to two sockets
 Xeon Platinum, Gold 61XX, and Gold 5122 have two AVX-512 FMA units per core; Xeon Gold 51XX (except 5122), Silver, and Bronze have a single AVX-512 FMA unit per core
 -F: integrated OmniPath fabric
 -M: 1536 GB RAM per socket vs 768 GB for non-M SKUs
 -P: integrated FPGA
 -T: High thermal-case and extended reliability

Xeon Bronze and Silver (dual processor) 
 Xeon Bronze 31XX has no HT or Turbo Boost support
 Xeon Bronze 31XX supports DDR4-2133 MHz RAM; Xeon Silver 41XX supports DDR4-2400 MHz RAM
 Xeon Bronze 31XX and Xeon Silver 41XX support two UPI links at 9.6 GT/s

Xeon Gold (quad processor) 
 Xeon Gold 51XX has two UPIs at 10.4 GT/s; Xeon Gold 61XX has three UPIs at 10.4 GT/s
 Xeon Gold 51XX support DDR4-2400 MHz RAM (except 5122); Xeon Gold 5122 and 61XX support DDR4-2666 MHz RAM

Xeon Platinum (octa processor) 
 Xeon Platinum has three UPIs at 10.4 GT/s.
 Xeon Platinum supports DDR4-2666 MHz RAM (except 8136).

Notes

References 

Intel Xeon (Skylake)